Hubert Münch (born 9 April 1941) is a retired German football defender and later manager.

References

1941 births
Living people
German footballers
FC Zürich players
FC Winterthur players
Association football defenders
Swiss Super League players
German football managers
FC Frauenfeld managers
FC Schaffhausen managers
Footballers from Stuttgart